Parallel structures may refer to:

 38th parallel structures, a series of carboniferous craters of the United States, approximately lying on the 38th parallel north
 Parallelism (grammar), a way to organize parts of a sentence.